Llanos de Karawala Natural Reserve is a nature reserve located in the South Caribbean Coast Autonomous Region of Nicaragua. It is one of the 78 reserves that are under official protection in the country.

Protected areas of Nicaragua